Microbeads are manufactured solid plastic particles of less than one millimeter in their largest dimension. They are most frequently made of polyethylene but can be of other petrochemical plastics such as polypropylene and polystyrene.

They are used in exfoliating personal care products, toothpastes and in biomedical and health-science research.

Microbeads can cause plastic particle water pollution and pose an environmental hazard for aquatic animals in freshwater and ocean water. In the US, the Microbead-Free Waters Act of 2015 phases out microbeads in rinse-off cosmetics by July 2017. Several other countries have also banned microbeads from rinse-off cosmetics, including Canada, France, New Zealand, Sweden, Taiwan and the United Kingdom.

Types

Microbeads are manufactured solid plastic particles of less than one millimeter in their largest dimension when they are first created, and are typically created using material such as polyethylene (PE), polyethylene terephthalate (PET), nylon (PA), polypropylene (PP) and polymethyl methacrylate (PMMA). The most frequently used materials are polyethylene or other petrochemical plastics such as polypropylene and polystyrene. Low melting temperature and fast phase transitions make them especially suitable for creating porous structures in ceramics and other materials.

Regional differences
The parameters for what qualifies as a microbead change subtly based on location and the corresponding legal jurisdiction; minor distinctions in the definition may be encountered from one country to another. For example, America's official definition for a microbead, as per the Microbead-Free Waters Act 2015 laid out by Congress, is "any solid plastic particle less than 5 millimeters in size that was created with the intention of being used to exfoliate or cleanse the human body." On the other hand, Environment and Climate Change Canada (ECCC), the governmental agency responsible for Canada's microbead ban, settled on a definition which includes only plastics with diameters between 0.5 microns and 2 millimeters; although initially cutoffs of 0.1 microns and 5 millimeters, respectively, were proposed, the definition was revised after consulting with members of industry and meeting resistance from plastic manufacturers who claimed that many of their raw materials (for example, those needed to make bottles for soft drinks) would be covered by the ban, affecting their business unduly. While the intent clause in the American law leaves open a loophole for producers of other equally frivolous and environmentally destructive products to potentially exploit in the future—as long as their use case does not involve grooming or personal care—the Canadian law has already been criticized publicly for its overly restrictive nature, which could cripple its efficacy in practice; in response to the revised definition, concerned conservation groups (including the Sierra Club of Canada) have raised warnings about the law's wording, fearing that Canada may "become a dumping ground for [those] microbead-containing products" which are now banned in the United States.

Use
Microbeads are added as an exfoliating agent to cosmetics and personal care products, such as soap, facial scrub and toothpastes. They may be added to over-the-counter drugs to make them easier to swallow.
In biomedical and health science research microbeads are used in microscopy techniques, fluid visualization, fluid flow analysis and process troubleshooting.

Sphericity and particle size uniformity create a ball-bearing effect in creams and lotions, resulting in a silky texture and spreadability. Smoothness and roundness can provide lubrication. Colored microspheres add visual appeal to cosmetic products.

Environmental effects
When microbeads are washed down the drain, they subsequently pass unfiltered through sewage treatment plants and make their way into rivers and canals, resulting in plastic particle water pollution.
A team of researchers from Uppsala University published and subsequently retracted a study (at least one researcher was found to have fabricated results)  which stated that one of the various animals affected by microbeads was perch, a freshwater fish. The beads can absorb and concentrate pollutants like pesticides and polycyclic hydrocarbons. Microbeads have been found to pollute the Great Lakes in high concentrations, particularly Lake Erie. A study from the State University of New York, found anywhere from 1,500 to 1.1 million microbeads per square mile on the surface of the Great Lakes.

One study suggested that environmentally relevant levels of polyethylene microbeads had no impact on larvae. Some wastewater treatment plants (WWTPs) in the U.S. and Europe can remove microbeads with an efficiency of greater than 98%, others may not. As such, other sources of microplastic pollution (e.g. microfibers/fibers and car tires) are more likely to be associated with environmental hazards.

A variety of wildlife, from insect larvae, small fish, amphibians and turtles to birds and larger mammals, mistake microbeads for their food source. This ingestion of plastics introduces the potential for toxicity not only to these animals but to other species higher in the food chain. Harmful chemicals thus transferred can include hydrophobic pollutants that collect on the surface of the water such as polychlorinated biphenyls (PCBs), dichlorodiphenyltrichloroethane (DDT), and polycyclic aromatic hydrocarbons (PAHs).

Banning production and sale in cosmetics

In 2012, the North Sea Foundation and the Plastic Soup Foundation launched an app that allows Dutch consumers to check whether personal care products contain microbeads. In the summer of 2013, the United Nations Environment Programme and UK based NGO Fauna and Flora International joined the partnership to further develop the app for international audiences. The app has enjoyed success, convincing a number of large multinationals to stop using microbeads, and is available in seven languages.
There are many natural and biodegradable alternatives to microbeads that have no environmental impact when washed down the drain, as they will either decompose or get filtered out before being released into the natural environment. Some examples to use as natural exfoliates include ground up almonds, oatmeal, sea salt and coconut husks. Burt's Bees and St. Ives use apricot pits and cocoa husks in their products instead of microbeads to reduce their negative environmental impact.

Due to the increase in bans of microbeads in the United States, many cosmetic companies are also phasing out microbeads from their production lines. L'Oréal is planning to phase out polyethylene microbeads in the exfoliates, cleansers and shower gels from their products by 2017. Johnson and Johnson, who have already started to phase out microbeads at the end of 2015, will by 2017 not be producing any polyethylene microbeads in their products. Lastly, Crest phased out microbead plastics in its toothpastes by February 2016. The global phase out should be completed by the end of 2017.

The following countries have taken action towards ban on microbeads.

Canada
On May 18, 2015, Canada took its first steps toward banning microbeads when a Member of Parliament from Toronto, John McKay, introduced Bill C-680, which would ban the sale of microbeads. The first Canadian province to take action against microbeads was Ontario, where Maire-France Lalonde, a Member of the Provincial Parliament introduced Microbead Elimination and Monitoring Act. This bill enforced the ban of manufacturing microbeads in cosmetics, facial scrubs or washes, and similar products. The bill also proposed that there would be yearly samples taken from the Canadian Great Lakes, which would be analyzed for traces of microbeads.

Pointe-Claire mayor Morris Trudeau and members of the City Council requested Pointe-Claire residents to sign a petition asking governments of Canada and Quebec to ban "the use of plastic microbeads in cosmetic and cleansing products." Trudeau suggested that if Quebec bans microbeads, manufactures will be encouraged to stop producing them in their products. Megan Leslie, Halifax Member of Parliament presented a motion against microbeads in the House of Commons, which got "unanimous support" and is hoping for them to be listed under the Canadian Environmental Protection Act as a toxin.

On June 29, 2016, the Federal Government of Canada added microbeads in the Canadian Environmental Protection Act under Schedule 1 as a toxic substance. The import or manufacture of toiletries containing microbeads was banned on 1 January 2018 and sales were banned from 1 July 2018. Microbeads in natural health products and non-prescription drugs will be banned in 2019.

Ireland
In November 2016 Simon Coveney, the Minister for Housing, Planning, Community and Local Government, said that the Fine Gael-led government would press for an EU-wide ban on microbeads and rejected a Green Party bill banning them on the basis that it might conflict with the EU's freedom of movement of goods. In June 2019, Coveney's successor Eoghan Murphy introduced the Microbeads (Prohibition) Bill 2019, which would ban manufacture, sale, and export of rinse-off microbead products. The government also intends to include microbeads when updating the law on preventing marine pollution. Microbeads were banned in February 2020.

Netherlands

The Netherlands was the first country to announce its intent to be free of microbeads in cosmetics by the end of 2016. State Secretary for Infrastructure and the Environment Mansveld has said she is pleased with the progress made by the members of the Nederlandse Cosmetica Vereniging (NCV), the Dutch trade organisation for producers and importers of cosmetics, who have ceased using microbeads or are working towards removing microbeads from their product. Among the NCV's members are large multinationals such as Unilever, L'Oréal, Colgate-Palmolive, Henkel, and Johnson & Johnson.

South Africa
A ban on microbeads has been proposed in South Africa after microplastic pollution was found in tap water.

United Kingdom
The British government has banned the production of microbeads in rinse-off cosmetics and cleaning products in England effective 9 January 2018, followed by a sales ban on 19 June 2018. Scotland introduced its own manufacture and sales ban on the same day and Wales introduced its on 30 June 2018. The ban was extended to Northern Ireland from 11 March 2019.

United States

National
At the federal level the Microbead-Free Waters Act of 2015 prohibits the manufacture and introduction into interstate commerce of rinse-off cosmetics containing intentionally-added plastic microbeads by July 1, 2017. Representative Frank Pallone proposed the bill in 2014 (H.R. 4895, reintroduced in 2015 as H.R. 1321). On December 7, 2015, his proposal was narrowed by amendment to rinse-off cosmetics, and passed unanimously by the House. The American Chemistry Council and other industry groups supported the final bill, which the Senate passed on December 18, 2015, and the president signed on December 28, 2015.

States
Illinois became the first U.S. state to enact legislation banning the manufacture and sale of products containing microbeads; the two-part ban goes into effect in 2018 and 2019. The Personal Care Products Council, a trade group for the cosmetics industry, came out in support of the Illinois bill. Other states have followed.

 all state bans except California's ban, allow biodegradable microbeads. Johnson & Johnson and Procter & Gamble opposed the California law.

In 2014, legislation was voted on but failed to pass in New York.

Local

In 2015, Erie County, New York passed the first local ban in the state of New York. It bans the sale and distribution of all plastic microbeads (including biodegradable ones) including from personal care products. , its prohibition on sales is stronger than any other law in the country. It was enacted on August 12, 2015 and took effect in February 2016.

In November 2015, four other NY counties followed suit.

See also
 Cenosphere
 Expandable microsphere
 Glass microsphere
 Microplastics
 Glitter
 Plastic particle water pollution

References

External links
 Glass vs Polyethylene Microspheres

Cosmetics chemicals
Plastics industry